A Johnson thermoelectric energy converter or JTEC is a type of solid-state heat engine that uses the electrochemical oxidation and reduction of hydrogen in a two-cell, thermal cycle that approximates the Ericsson cycle.   It is under investigation as a viable alternative to conventional thermoelectric conversion. Lonnie Johnson invented it and claims the converter exhibits an energy conversion efficiency of as much as 60%, however, this claim is at a theoretical level based on comparison with a Carnot cycle and assumes a temperature gradient of 600 °C. It was originally proposed for funding to the Office of Naval Research but was refused. Johnson obtained later funding by framing the engine as a hydrogen fuel cell.  Johnson had been collaborating with PARC on development of the engine.

Mechanism of action
The JTEC is a form of heat engine that converts thermal energy into electrical energy by compressing and expanding hydrogen gas.  It operates as a closed system with no moving classical mechanical parts, requires no input of fuel, and creates no exhaust.  The engine consists of two stages: A low-temperature compression stage and a high-temperature power stage.  Each stage consists of a working fluid chamber that a copper lined membrane electrode assembly (MEA) bisects.  A MEA is a proprietary ceramic proton exchange membrane (PEM) that is sandwiched between two electrodes.

The operation is similar to an alkali-metal thermal to electric converter, using hydrogen as the working fluid rather than the highly-reactive molten alkali metals, which are difficult to work with.
In the high-temperature power stage, expanding high pressure hydrogen from the compression stage converts the heat energy into electrical energy via the MEA.  As the high-temperature, high pressure hydrogen is forced through the PEM it is ionized, producing protons and electrons.  The protons pass through the membrane while the electrodes expel the electrons through a load.  After passing through the PEM, the protons recombine with the electrons to produce low pressure hydrogen gas that flows out to the compression stage.  From the perspective of the high-temperature stage, the load consists of the external load on the engine and the low-temperature compression stage.  In the compression stage, electrical potential is applied across the MEA and forces protons to flow through the PEM to produce high pressure hydrogen.  As the hydrogen travels between the stages, it passes through a heat exchanger that increases efficiency by helping to keep the high-temperature stage hot and the low-temperature stage cool.

The amount of energy available to the external load is the difference in electrical potential between that needed to compress hydrogen at low-temperature and that which expanding it at high temperature generates.  Unlike other heat pump devices, the JTEC requires an initial input of electrical energy to start the compression stage and initiate the cycle.  In principle, the engine can also be operated in reverse to convert electrical energy into a temperature differential, for example in HVAC applications.  In one proposed application, solar irradiance would heat the power stage, and the compression stage would connect to an ambient temperature heat sink.

Applications
The scalability of the engine leads its developers to claim that its potential applications range from providing power for microelectromechanical systems (MEMS) to functioning as large-scale power plants.

The converter can use many diverse forms of fuel without the need for fuel-specific customization as seen in internal combustion engines, and can generate power from fuel combustion, solar irradiance, low grade waste heat from industry, or such other power generation systems as fuel cells, internal combustion engines, or turbines, because it functions as an external combustion engine.

See also 
 Alkali-metal thermal to electric converter

References

External links
Video: Solve for x Moonshots 2014

Energy conversion
Thermoelectricity
Cooling technology
Heat pumps
External combustion engines